Gold digging may refer to:

 Gold digger, a person, usually female, who enters a relationship purely for monetary gain
 Gold mining, the process of mining for gold ore
 Gold panning